Ryan Esders (born 20 October 1986 in Kingston upon Hull) is an English former rugby league footballer who played in the 2000s and 2010s.

References

External links
Harlequins Rugby League profile

1986 births
Living people
Dewsbury Rams players
English rugby league players
Hull Kingston Rovers players
London Broncos players
Rugby league locks
Rugby league second-rows
Rugby league players from Kingston upon Hull
York City Knights players